Mohammad Hafiz bin Mohd Nor (born 22 August 1988) is a Singaporean professional footballer who plays as a full-back or winger for Singapore Premier League club Lion City Sailors and the Singapore national team.

Club career

Tanjong Pagar United
A late bloomer, Hafiz began his professional football career with Tanjong Pagar United in the S.League in 2011, at the age of 22. After joining Home United in 2012, Hafiz return to Tanjong Pagar in the mid transfer for the remaining of the 2012 and 2013 S.League season. He won the S.League Goal of the Season award in 2013 and earned himself his first call-up for Singapore.

Home United
After 1 year with Tanjong Pagar, it was announced that Hafiz would join Home United for the 2012 S.League season.

Geylang International
It was announced in 2014 that Hafiz would join Geylang International.

Warriors
Hafiz joined Warriors in 2016 and that was where he was recalled up to the national team.

Home United 
Hafiz rejoined Home United in 2017 and racked up his most productive season in the 2019 Singapore Premier League season with the Protectors, scoring 9 goals in all competitions.

International career
He received his first call-up to the Singapore in 2013, making his international debut in the 5–2 victory over Laos on 7 June 2013. He gained his second international cap against Cambodia on 28 July 2016, replacing Hafiz Sujad in the 68th minute.

Hafiz had to wait a further 3 years again before gaining another call-up. However, after winning his 3rd cap, he is set to be a fixture in the Singapore team to come as Head Coach Tatsuma Yoshida credits him with bringing energy and discipline to the Lions and is set to name Hafiz for a third straight start in the World Cup qualifier. Hafiz then repaid the coach's faith as he scored his first goal for Singapore in his sixth cap when he scored the winner in a 2–1 win over Yemen in a 2022 FIFA World Cup qualification match. He scored his second goal for the Lions when he unleashed a first-time volley off Nur Adam Abdullah's cross from the left in a 6-2 win over Myanmar in the final match of their Asian Cup third-round qualifiers. 

In 2022, Hafiz was part of the national team for the 2022 AFF Championship.

Career statistics

Club
. Caps and goals may not be correct.

International

International caps

International goals 

 Scores and results list Singapore's goal tally first.

Honours

Club

Lion City Sailors 

 Singapore Premier League:
 Champion: 2021

References

External links
 
 

1988 births
Living people
Singaporean footballers
Singapore international footballers
Association football midfielders
Tanjong Pagar United FC players
Home United FC players
Geylang International FC players
Singapore Premier League players
Singaporean people of Malay descent
Lion City Sailors FC players